Anoplodesmus humberti is a species of millipede in the family Paradoxosomatidae. It is endemic to Sri Lanka, which was first documented from Peradeniya.

References

Polydesmida
Millipedes of Asia
Endemic fauna of Sri Lanka
Animals described in 1902